Members of the Rajya Sabha (Council of States) or the upper house of Parliament of India are indirectly elected by the elected Members of the Legislative Assemblies of all the states of India and union territories having a State Legislative Assembly (Delhi, Jammu and Kashmir and Puducherry). Rajya Sabha members represent the states of India. Candidates who win the Rajya Sabha elections are called 'Member of Parliament' and hold their seats for six years. The house meets in the Rajya Sabha Chamber of the Sansad Bhavan in New Delhi, on matters relating to creation of new laws, removing or improving the existing laws that affect all citizens of India. Elections take place annually to elect 233 members for the Rajya Sabha, of which one third of the members retire in every two years.

The first elections to the Rajya Sabha took place in 1952.

Rajya Sabha elections by year
 1950s: 1952, 1953, 1954, 1955, 1956, 1957, 1958, 1959

 1960s: 1960, 1961, 1962, 1963, 1964, 1965, 1966, 1967, 1968, 1969

 1970s: 1970, 1971, 1972, 1973, 1974, 1975, 1976, 1977, 1978, 1979

 1980s: 1980, 1981, 1982, 1983, 1984, 1985, 1986, 1987, 1988, 1989

 1990s: 1990, 1991, 1992, 1993, 1994, 1995, 1996, 1997, 1998, 1999

 2000s: 2000, 2001, 2002, 2003, 2004, 2005, 2006, 2007, 2008, 2009

 2010s: 2010, 2011, 2012, 2013, 2014, 2015, 2016, 2017, 2018, 2019

 2020s: 2020, 2021, 2022, 2023, 2024

See also
 Elections in India
 List of Indian presidential elections
 List of Indian vice presidential elections
 List of Indian general elections
 List of Indian state legislative assembly elections
 Government of India
 Parliament of India
 Rajya Sabha
 Member of Parliament, Rajya Sabha

References

India

India politics-related lists